Carboxypeptidase U (arginine carboxypeptidase, carboxypeptidase R, plasma carboxypeptidase B, thrombin-activatable fibrinolysis inhibitor) is an enzyme. This enzyme catalyses the following chemical reaction

 Release of C-terminal Arg and Lys from a polypeptide

Pro-carboxypeptidase U in (human) plasma is activated by thrombin or plasmin during clotting to form the unstable carboxypeptidase U.

See also 
 Carboxypeptidase

References

External links 
 

EC 3.4.17